James McConica (born December 19, 1950) is an American former competition swimmer and world record-holder. McConica won two gold medals at the 1971 Pan American Games in Cali, Colombia, including the men's 400-meter freestyle, and the 4x200-meter freestyle relay.  He also received a Pan Am silver medal for his second-place finish in the 200-meter freestyle.  The American gold medal team in the 4x200-meter freestyle relay set a new world record of 7:45.8.  McConica holds numerous freestyle senior swimming world records in all four age brackets from 50–54 to 65–69.

See also
 List of University of Southern California people
 World record progression 4 × 200 metres freestyle relay

References

1950 births
Living people
American male butterfly swimmers
American male freestyle swimmers
World record setters in swimming
Pan American Games gold medalists for the United States
Pan American Games silver medalists for the United States
Swimmers at the 1971 Pan American Games
USC Trojans men's swimmers
Pan American Games medalists in swimming
Universiade medalists in swimming
Universiade gold medalists for the United States
Universiade bronze medalists for the United States
Medalists at the 1970 Summer Universiade
Medalists at the 1973 Summer Universiade
Medalists at the 1971 Pan American Games